Zachary Lieberman is an American new media artist, designer, computer programmer, and educator.

Early life and education
Born in 1977, Lieberman holds a B.A. in Fine Arts from Hunter College and both a B.F.A. and M.F.A. in Design and Technology from Parsons School of Design.

Work
Lieberman's work has appeared in numerous exhibitions around the world, including Ars Electronica, Futuresonic, CeBIT, and the Off Festival.

He collaborated with artist Golan Levin on the interactive audiovisual project  "Messa Di Voce".

With Theo Watson and Arturo Castro, he created openFrameworks, an open source C++ library for creative coding and graphics.

Lieberman has held residencies at Ars Electronica Futurelab, Eyebeam, Dance Theater Workshop, and the Hangar Center for the Arts in Barcelona. In 2013, he co-founded the School for Poetic Computation, a hybrid of a school, residency and research group in New York City.

His work uses technology in a playful way to break down the fragile boundary between the visible and the invisible.
His art work focuses around computer graphics, human-computer interaction, and computer vision.

He teaches graphics programming classes at Parsons School of Design.

Awards & distinctions

 2018: Maryland Institute College of Art, William O. Steinmetz ’50, Designer-in-Residence.
 2010: AOL, 25x25 artist grant
 2010: Golden Nica in Interactive Art for the project Eyewriter, Prix Ars Electronica. Shared with James Powderly, Tony Quan, Evan Roth, Chris Sugrue (US) and Theo Watson (UK).
 2010: Number 36, of the "100 Most Creative People in Business", Fast Company
 2009: Artist's Grant, New York State Council on the Arts
 2008: Honorary Mention at Ars Electronica in the Interactive Art category, for the OpenFrameworks project, shared with Theo Watson
 2006: Award, CynetArt competition.
 2006: Award of Distinction, Ars Electronica 2006 Prix.
 2005: Artist's Grant, New York State Council on the Arts
 2005: Nominee, Artist of the Year, 6th Annual WIRED magazine Rave Award
 2004: Honorable Mention, Interactive Art, Prix Ars Electronica 2004

References

External links
 thesystemis, Lieberman's personal website
 openFrameworks
 Drawn: on Zachary Lieberman’s work
 Interview on Window.org.nz
 Interview on Rocketboom
 Unexpected: live performance, technology and the risk of something (or everything) going wrong. ie, learning love chance, talk by Zachary Lieberman at Medialab Prado, 15 October 2009
 New York Times article about School for Poetic Computation

Living people
American digital artists
Hunter College alumni
Modern artists
American video artists
Parsons School of Design alumni
1977 births
Parsons School of Design faculty